Emily Taylor (born 28 June 1987 in Lincoln) is a former British rower.

Taylor learned to row at Durham University.

She was part of the British crew that won the silver medal in the Women's Eight at the 2008 European Rowing Championships, having won Bronze in the Women's Coxless Four at the World Rowing U23 Championships the previous year. She was the spare for the British Women's Eight crew at the 2008 Summer Olympics

In the aftermath Taylor criticised rowing coach Paul Thompson for creating a 'culture of fear' within the training squad. The accusation prompted British Rowing to launch an internal review.

References

External links
 

1987 births
Living people
English female rowers
Durham University Boat Club rowers
Alumni of Hatfield College, Durham
European Rowing Championships medalists